Ernest Ellis  is an Australian singer-songwriter. His fourth album, The Pariah, was written over four years after his move to New York City.

Discography

Albums

Charting singles

References

21st-century Australian singers
21st-century Australian male singers
Living people
Year of birth missing (living people)